HIC may refer to:

 Habitat International Coalition
 Hybrid integrated circuit
 Head injury criterion, a measure of the likelihood of head injury generated by crash tests
 Heart Institute of the Caribbean, Jamaica
 HIC1, the protein encoded by the human HIC1 gene
 HIC2, the protein encoded by the human HIC2 gene
 Hipparcos Input Catalogue, an astronomical catalogue
 Humanitarian Information Centers, managed by the United Nations Office for the Coordination of Humanitarian Affairs
 Hydrophobic Interaction Chromatography, a chemistry technique

Hic may refer to:
 The onomatopoeia for the sound made when hiccuping

See also
 Hi-C (disambiguation)